Su Chia-fu is a Taiwanese politician.

Su was elected to the National Assembly in 1996. He was appointed to the Legislative Yuan on 2 June 2004 to replace Chen Chung-hsin on the Democratic Progressive Party list. Su's brothers include Su Chia-chuan and Su Chia-chyuan.

References

Politicians of the Republic of China on Taiwan from Pingtung County
Party List Members of the Legislative Yuan
Living people
Year of birth missing (living people)
Democratic Progressive Party Members of the Legislative Yuan
Members of the 5th Legislative Yuan